The 1981 Tefilin Polyesters season was the second and final season of the franchise in the Philippine Basketball Association (PBA).

Summary
Tefilin's import from the previous season – Ira Terrell, returned for the Open Conference, this time teaming up with former Royal Tru-Orange import Larry Pounds. Tefilin was tied with CDCP Road Builders after 18 games in the eliminations. Both sophomore ballclubs missed out a semifinal berth and were two games behind fourth qualifier Toyota Super Diesels.

The Polyesters signed up Norman Black, who played for the Detroit Pistons in the Southern California Summer Pro league, as their import in the Reinforced Filipino Conference. Black led the Polyesters to move into the next round for the first time in four conferences.

Won-loss record vs Opponents

Scoring record
Norman Black poured in 71 points in Tefilin's 129–141 loss to Crispa in their quarterfinal game on October 27. Black's 71-point total was four points shy of the 75 points made by CDCP's Ronald McCoy in this same conference just a month before on September 26. Norman Black's total output was the fourth all-time best scoring record behind the 75 points jointly shared by Ronald McCoy and Harry Rogers of 7-Up in 1976, the 74 points made by Yco-Tanduay's Russell Murray, also in this same conference and the 73 points set by Carl Bird of Royal Tru-Orange in 1976.

Roster

References

Tefilin
Tefilin Polyesters